Dorothy Samali Hyuha is a Ugandan diplomat, educator, and politician. She is the High Commissioner (Ambassador) of Uganda to Malaysia. She previously served as Minister Without Portfolio in the Cabinet of Uganda. From 2006 until 2011, Hyuha served as the Butaleja District Woman MP in the Ugandan Parliament. During the same time-frame, she concurrently served as the deputy secretary general of the National Resistance Movement (NRM) political party.

Career
Hyuha was first elected to the Uganda Parliament in 1996 as a representative of Tororo District, a post she held until 2006. After Butaleja District was carved out of Tororo District in 2006, she won the parliamentary seat of women's representative for Butalehja District on the NRM party ticket. She held that position until she lost the seat in 2011 to Cerinah Nebanda. From 2009 until 2011 she served as Minister Without Portfolio. In August 2012, Hyuha was appointed Uganda's High Commissioner to Tanzania, where she served until August 2017 and transferred to Malaysia under the same role. She is currently serving at the High Commission of the Republic of Uganda to Malaysia.

Personal details
She is a member of the ruling NRM political party. She was married to Daniel Hyuha, who died in December 2014 at age 68. They owned three homes in the Butalja District.

See also 
 Butaleja District 
National Resistance Movement 
Cabinet of Uganda

References

External links
Website of the Uganda High Commission to Tanzania

1962 births
Living people
People from Butaleja District
Makerere University alumni
Ugandan educators
Ugandan Anglicans
Members of the Parliament of Uganda
Government ministers of Uganda
National Resistance Movement politicians
Women government ministers of Uganda
Women members of the Parliament of Uganda